David Corley Jr. (April 12, 1980) is an American football coach and former quarterback. He played college football at William & Mary and is currently the assistant quarterbacks coach of the Pittsburgh Steelers of the National Football League (NFL).

Early life
Corley Jr. was born in Salisbury, North Carolina, the son of David Sr. and Gail Corley.  David played high school football at Fairfield Central High in Winnsboro, South Carolina. In Corley's last two years of high school, Fairfield went 30-0 and won back-to-back state football championships.

College playing career
Corley Jr. played football as a four-year starting Quarterback at NCAA Division I FCS William & Mary from 1999 to 2002.  He signed with the Tribe because of coach Jimmye Laycock's reputation for developing quarterbacks, even though Corley was recruited by Clemson, South Carolina, Wake Forest and Georgia Tech. In 2001, throwing for 2,808 yards and 21 touchdowns he led the Tribe to an 8-4 record, Atlantic 10 title and NCAA I-AA Playoff appearance.  Corley still holds many all-time records at William and Mary including passing yards (9,805), total yards (10,948) and touchdown passes (73). In 2014 Corley Jr. was elected into the W&M Athletics Hall of Fame.

Coaching career
Corley spent 2004–2005 at the high school level coaching quarterbacks at C.A. Johnson Preparatory Academy in Columbia, South Carolina. Initially hired as the running backs coach for the Nittany Lions, for the 2018 season, Corley was switched to wide receivers coach after the hiring of Ja'Juan Seider, two weeks later.  On January 2, 2019, one day after Penn State’s loss to Kentucky in the Citrus Bowl, Corley was relieved of his duties as wide receiver coach for the Nittany Lions.

Pittsburgh Steelers
On April 19, 2022, the Pittsburgh Steelers hired Corley as their Assistant quarterbacks coach

Personal
Corley graduated from William & Mary in 2002.

References

External links
 Penn State profile

1980 births
Living people
American football quarterbacks
Players of Canadian football from South Carolina
Canadian football quarterbacks
Army Black Knights football coaches
Calgary Stampeders players
Hamilton Tiger-Cats players
New York Dragons players
Penn State Nittany Lions football coaches
UConn Huskies football coaches
William & Mary Tribe football coaches
William & Mary Tribe football players
High school football coaches in South Carolina
People from Salisbury, North Carolina
People from Winnsboro, South Carolina
Pittsburgh Steelers coaches
Coaches of American football from South Carolina
Players of American football from South Carolina
African-American coaches of American football
African-American players of American football
African-American players of Canadian football